Biochemical detection is the science and technology of detecting biochemicals and their concentration where trace analysis is concerned this is usually done by using a quartz crystal microbalance, which measures a mass per unit area by measuring the change in frequency of a quartz crystal resonator. Another method is with nanoparticles.

References

Bibliography

Biochemistry
Detection theory